Hüseyin Avni Zaimler (1877, Bitola – March 10, 1930, Adana), also known as Huseyin Avni Bey or Huseyin Avni Pasha, was an officer of the Ottoman Army and a general of the Turkish Army. After the declaration of the Republic of Turkey, he became a politician and served in the Grand National Assembly of Turkey. With Mustafa Kemal Atatürk's order on November 21, 1923, Huseyin Avni received the Medal of Independence with Red-Green Ribbon, the highest decoration at the time, for his service during the Turkish War of Independence. On 24 January 1924, he was promoted to rank Mirliva. He was a descendant of the Ottoman Grand Vizier Lala Mehmed Pasha.

Biography
Huseyin Avni was born in 1877 as the son of Mustafa Bey. Upon graduating from Monastir Military High School in 1893, where he befriended Mustafa Kemal Atatürk, he attended Ottoman Military Academy. In 1903 he was promoted to the rank of Captain and in 1908 he was promoted to the rank of Major.

Medals and decorations
Medal of Independence with Red-Green Ribbon

See also
List of recipients of the Medal of Independence with Red-Green Ribbon (Turkey)

Sources

External links

1877 births
1930 deaths
Pashas
People from Bitola
People from Manastir vilayet
Macedonian Turks
Republican People's Party (Turkey) politicians
Deputies of Osmaniye
Ottoman Army officers
Turkish Army generals
Ottoman military personnel of the Greco-Turkish War (1897)
Ottoman military personnel of the Balkan Wars
Ottoman prisoners of war
Ottoman military personnel of World War I
Members of Kuva-yi Milliye
Turkish military personnel of the Greco-Turkish War (1919–1922)
Monastir Military High School alumni
Ottoman Military Academy alumni
Recipients of the Medal of Independence with Red-Green Ribbon (Turkey)